The Raggeds Wilderness is a U.S. Wilderness Area located in the Elk Mountains northwest of Crested Butte, Colorado. The  wilderness was established in 1980 in the White River and Gunnison National Forests. Nearly  of trails are within the wilderness.

References

Wilderness areas of Colorado
Protected areas established in 1980
Protected areas of Gunnison County, Colorado
White River National Forest
Gunnison National Forest
1980 establishments in Colorado